Biltmore Village Commercial Buildings is a set of two historic commercial buildings located at Biltmore Village, Asheville, Buncombe County, North Carolina.  They were designed by architect Richard Sharp Smith and built about 1900.  They are a 1 1/2-story pebbledash finished building with a gable roof and half-timbering and a small one-story building that originally housed the Biltmore Village Post Office.

It was listed on the National Register of Historic Places in 1979.

References

External links

Commercial buildings on the National Register of Historic Places in North Carolina
Commercial buildings completed in 1900
Buildings and structures in Asheville, North Carolina
National Register of Historic Places in Buncombe County, North Carolina